Hernán Darío Muñoz Giraldo (born January 5, 1973 in Rionegro, Antioquia) is a Colombian former professional road cyclist.

Career

1997
 2nd Overall Vuelta a Venezuela
1st Stage 9
 3rd Overall Vuelta al Táchira
1st Stages 10b & 12
1998
 1st Overall Clásica Nacional Marco Fidel Suárez
 1st Overall Vuelta a Chiriquí
 1st Overall Vuelta a Costa Rica
 1st Stage 7 Vuelta al Táchira
 1st Stage 2 Clásico RCN
 2nd Road race, National Road Championships
1999
 1st Overall Clasica Alcaldía de Pasca
 1st Overall Vuelta a Antioquia
2002
 1st Overall Tour de Langkawi
1st Stage 9
 1st Stage 12 Vuelta a Colombia
2003
 1st Overall Vuelta al Táchira
1st Stages 8 & 13
 2nd Overall Tour de Langkawi
1st Stage 9
2004
 1st Overall Clasica Ciclo Acosta-Bello
1st Prologue
 1st Stage 3 (TTT) Doble Copacabana GP Fides
 2nd Overall Vuelta a Cundinamarca
2005
 1st Overall Vuelta al Tolima
1st Stage 3
2006
 1st Overall Vuelta a Uraba
1st Stage 3
 1st Overall Vuelta Mazatlán
1st Stage 3
 1st Overall Vuelta a Puebla
1st Stage 2
 2nd Overall Vuelta a Guatemala
2007
 1st Stage 2 Tour of the Gila
 2nd Overall Vuelta de Bisbee
1st Stage 3
 3rd Overall Tucson Bicycle Classic
2009
 1st Stage 2 Vuelta a Antioquia
 2nd Cham-Hagendorn

External links
 

1973 births
Living people
People from Rionegro
Colombian male cyclists
Vuelta a Colombia stage winners
Sportspeople from Antioquia Department
21st-century Colombian people